Jared Shavelson is an American drummer from Cherry Hill, New Jersey. He attended SUNY where he studied jazz. After two years at Music Conservatory he joined The Hope Conspiracy. In 2006 he joined None More Black and played with Paint It Black. He moved to Los Angeles where he played Digital Daggers and played on the album Anthems by Pure Love. He is currently a member BoySetsFire, and has recently toured as the drummer for Meg Myers, Seal, and The Bronx in 2018 and 2019.

Discography

References 

American drummers
Living people
Year of birth missing (living people)